Derrick Nsibambi (born 19 June 1994) is a Ugandan professional footballer who most recently played for Egyptian club Smouha and the Uganda national team as a forward.

Career
He has played club football for Kampala Capital City Authority and Smouha.

He made his international debut for Uganda in 2017.

Career statistics

International

International goals
Scores and results list Uganda's goal tally first.

Honours

Individual
 CECAFA Cup top scorer: 2017

References

1994 births
Living people
Ugandan footballers
Uganda international footballers
Kampala Capital City Authority FC players
Smouha SC players
Egyptian Premier League players
Association football forwards
Ugandan expatriate footballers
Ugandan expatriate sportspeople in Egypt
Expatriate footballers in Egypt
2019 Africa Cup of Nations players
Sportspeople from Kampala
Uganda A' international footballers
2018 African Nations Championship players